Tropicana Avenue is a major east–west section line arterial in the Las Vegas area. The road is named after Tropicana Las Vegas which is located on Las Vegas Boulevard where it intersects with Tropicana Avenue. Part of it is signed as Nevada State Route 593 (SR 593).

Route description

SR 593 begins at Dean Martin Drive (formerly Industrial Road) in the unincorporated town of Paradise. From there, the highway travels east over Interstate 15 and crosses Las Vegas Boulevard (former SR 604) in the Las Vegas Strip. The highway continues east past the Las Vegas Strip where the highway intersects at Paradise Road (southbound) (former SR 605)/Swenson Street (northbound). Paradise Road provides access to Harry Reid International Airport (south of the Tropicana Avenue and Paradise Road intersection) and SR 593 serves as the southern end of the University of Nevada, Las Vegas (UNLV) campus (including the Thomas & Mack Center). SR 593 continues following Tropicana Avenue east at the junction of Interstate 515 and U.S. Routes 93 and 95. About a mile from the Interstate 515, U.S. Route 93 and U.S. Route 95 junction, SR 593 has an intersection at Nellis Boulevard (SR 612) where the highway enters the unincorporated town of Whitney just before terminating at Boulder Highway (SR 582).

Much of Tropicana Avenue is designated as a part of the National Highway System (NHS). SR 593 from Dean Martin Drive to Boulder Highway comprises the state maintained portion of this NHS routing. Tropicana Avenue between Rainbow Boulevard (SR 595) and Dean Martin Drive is a locally maintained part of the NHS.

History

Tropicana was originally named Bond Road before it was renamed after a hotel and casino adjacent to the street.

The state maintained portion of Tropicana Avenue previously extended from its current terminus west to Rainbow Boulevard (SR 595). This portion of SR 593 had been relinquished to Clark County by 2006.

Major intersections

Attractions
Notable attractions along the road include:
The Orleans
Wild Wild West Gambling Hall & Hotel
Excalibur Hotel and Casino
New York-New York Hotel and Casino
Tropicana Las Vegas
MGM Grand Las Vegas
Hooters Casino Hotel
Liberace Museum Collection

Public transport
RTC Transit Routes 201, 601 & 602 function on this road.

See also

References

Streets in the Las Vegas Valley
Transportation in Clark County, Nevada